A  in Shinto terminology is an object capable of attracting spirits called , thus giving them a physical space to occupy during religious ceremonies.  are used during ceremonies to call the  for worship. The word itself literally means "approach substitute". Ropes called  decorated with paper streamers called  often surround  to make their sacredness manifest.

History 
 and their history are intimately connected with the birth of Shinto shrines. Early Japanese culture did not have the notion of anthropomorphic deities, and felt the presence of spirits in nature and its phenomena. These sacred places and their  gradually evolved into the shrines of today.

A trace of this origin can be found in the term , literally meaning "deity storehouse", which evolved into  (also written with the characters ), one of the earliest words for a shrine. Most of the sacred objects found today in shrines (trees, mirrors, swords) were originally , and only later became  themselves by association.

Common  

Trees 

Because of the emphasis on nature in Shinto,  are often natural objects like trees. Many shrines still have on their grounds one of the original great , a great tree surrounded by a sacred rope called .

Iwakura rocks are also common. With time, through a process of association, the  itself can come to be considered divine. Archeological research in Japan confirms these sects to be ancient.

In homes 

 are most numerous in people's homes. There are  who dwell in the toilet and in the well. The  lives in the oven, and its function is to protect the house from fires. ( were originally meant just for Buddhist worship, but now often contain also spirit tablets called , which are  used to recall the spirits of one's dead ancestors). In shops one often sees clay cats with a raised paw called , or rake-like bamboo objects called  supposed to attract good business.

See also
Anito
Balete tree
Glossary of Shinto

Notes

References 

  
 
 
 

Shinto in Japan
Shinto religious objects